Bárbara María Berruezo (born 16 January 1985) is an Argentine badminton player. She competed at the 2015 Pan American Games in Toronto, Canada, and 2018 South American Games in Cochabamba, Bolivia.

Achievements

BWF International Challenge/Series 
Women's singles

Women's doubles

  BWF International Challenge tournament
  BWF International Series tournament
  BWF Future Series tournament

References

External links 
 
 

Living people
1985 births
People from Salta
Argentine female badminton players
Badminton players at the 2015 Pan American Games
Pan American Games competitors for Argentina
Competitors at the 2018 South American Games
Sportspeople from Salta Province
20th-century Argentine women
21st-century Argentine women